A by-election was conducted for the Queensland Legislative Assembly seat of Toowoomba South on 16 July 2016, following the 29 April resignation of LNP MP John McVeigh. McVeigh resigned after he was preselected as the LNP candidate for the federal division of Groom at the 2016 federal election.

Nominations
The six candidates in ballot paper order are as follows:

Result

References

External links
Electoral Commission Queensland: 2016 Toowoomba South By-Election
ABC Elections: 2016 Toowoomba South by-election

2016 elections in Australia
Queensland state by-elections